Rim Jong-sim (born 25 April 1994) is a North Korean freestyle wrestler. She won one of the bronze medals in the women's freestyle 62 kg event at the 2018 Asian Games held in Jakarta, Indonesia.

Career 

At the 2016 Asian Wrestling Championships held in Bangkok, Thailand, she won the silver medal in the women's 63 kg event.

In 2019, she competed in the women's freestyle 62 kg event at the World Wrestling Championships held in Nur-Sultan, Kazakhstan. In this competition she lost her bronze medal match against Yukako Kawai of Japan.

Major results

References

External links 
 

Living people
1994 births
Place of birth missing (living people)
North Korean female sport wrestlers
Asian Games medalists in wrestling
Asian Games bronze medalists for North Korea
Wrestlers at the 2018 Asian Games
Medalists at the 2018 Asian Games
Asian Wrestling Championships medalists
21st-century North Korean women